Shahid Kazemi Dam  (originally named Kourosh Dam and also known as the Shahid Kazemi Bukan Dam and Bukan Dam) is a clay core dam on the Zarrineh River in the Zagros Mountains range, located near Bukan in West Azarbaijan Province, Iran.

The crown of this dam is located 25 km Northeast of Bukan on the border of Kurdistan province and West Azarbaijan Province. The reservoir and lake of the dam are located in Kurdistan province and its catchment area is from Chehel Cheshmeh and Kileh Shin mountains in Zagros mountains between Saqqez and Baneh and Divandarreh. 

This Dam was constructed to store water for supplying drinking water to cities, irrigation and produce hydroelectric power.

Geography 
In Kazemi Dam Lake, various islands have been formed that are the habitats of animal species, especially a number of rare ones, including species of birds. Larus are one of the most important species of birds that live in the islands and around the lake, which itself has different species. This lake has surprised and delighted people and environmental experts because the habitat of these creatures is mostly on the shores of large seas and lakes.
 
Nazargah Island is the largest island in the lake. One of the advantages of these islands is the protection of rare bird species from the danger of being hunted by other animals such as wolves, snakes and foxes. Also, millions of fish are raised in this lake every year and are sent to the markets by fishermen during the fishing season.

See also

List of power stations in Iran
Zagros Mountains

References

Dams in Kurdistan Province
Buttress dams
Hydroelectric power stations in Iran
Dams completed in 1971
Bukan County